Jeet Kune Do is an  "eclectic martial arts philosophy" conceived and practiced by martial artist Bruce Lee during his lifetime. It was formed from Lee's experiences in unarmed fighting and self-defense, as well as philosophical influence from Eclecticism, Zen Buddhism and Taoism, to serve as a new field of martial arts thought.

Jeet Kune Do was conceived as kind of "intelligent martial art", not only in terms of fighting methods, as it aims to make the human body learn as much as possible, as if it becomes fluid "like water", and everything in the art follows that principle.

The core of Jeet Kune Do mentality is aimed at "intercepting" the opponent, the action or idea of wanting to "strike" the incoming attack itself. It is a set of principles to help the practitioner to make instant judgments and decisions, to improve the self of physical and on a mental level, as well as to make corresponding action responses or counterattacks.

Significant feature of Jeet Kune Do is that it focuses on "practical application in life" and discards the routines and metaphysics of traditional martial arts. Its fighting skills have absorbed and integrated some practical martial arts of the world, with martial arts such as Boxing, Wing Chun, Fencing and Jujutsu serving as the technical backbone of Jeet Kune Do.

Since Bruce Lee himself never truly formalized Jeet Kune Do before he died, the Jeet Kune Do taught by later generations may deviate from his original intent. Regardless, all of the Jeet Kune Do schools still independently continue to interpret the mode of self-knowledge in accordance with the basic martial arts philosophy created by Bruce Lee.

Overview and philosophy

Originally, Lee studied Wing Chun as well as researched other forms of martial arts and would formalize a martial art named Jun Fan Gung Fu circa 1962. However, around 1964, following his encounter with Wong Jack-man, Lee came to realize the error of binding oneself to systematized martial arts. Following this, Lee began to passionately research in order to refine his way of practicing martial arts. In 1965, he outlined the basic concept of Jeet Kune Do.

Not wanting to create another style that would share the limitations that all styles had, he instead described the process which he used to create

Lee stated his concept does not add more and more things on top of each other to form a system, but rather selects the best thereof. The metaphor Lee borrowed from Chan Buddhism was of constantly filling a cup with water, and then emptying it, used for describing Lee's philosophy of "casting off what is useless".

Lee considered traditional form-based martial arts, that only practiced pre-arranged patterns, forms and techniques to be restrictive and at worst, ineffective in dealing with chaotic self-defense situations. Lee believed that real combat was alive and dynamic.

Jeet Kune Do was conceived to be dynamic, to enable its practitioners to adapt to the constant changes and fluctuations of live combat. He believed these decisions should be made within the context of "real combat" and/or "all-out sparring" and that it was only in this environment that a practitioner could actually deem a technique worthy of adoption.

Principles
Unlike most other martial arts, Jeet Kune Do is not fixed or patterned. Instead, it is a concept-based philosophy with guiding principles. The term Jeet Kune Do was coined and put into use in 1967 by Bruce Lee in an attempt to put a name to his martial expression. Lee wrestled with putting a name to his art as he constantly veered away from any type of crystallization (and thereby limitation) of its essence, however, the simple need to refer to it in some concrete way won out and Jeet Kune Do was born. The idea of intercepting is key to JKD, whether it be the interception of your opponent’s technique or his intent. The basic guiding principles are: Simplicity, Directness and Freedom (the form of no form).

The following are principles that Lee incorporated into Jeet Kune Do. He felt that universal combat truths were self-evident, and would lead to combat success if followed. Familiarity with each of the "four ranges of combat", in particular, is thought to be instrumental in becoming a "total" martial artist.

JKD believes the best defense is a strong offense, hence the principle of an "intercepting fist". For someone to attack another hand-to-hand, the attacker must approach the target. This provides an opportunity for the targeted person to "intercept" the attacking movement. The principle of interception may be applied to more than intercepting the actual physical attack; non-verbal cues (subtle movements of which opponent may be unaware) may also be perceived or "intercepted", and thus used to one's advantage.
The "five ways of attack", categories that help JKD practitioners organize their fighting repertoire, comprise the offensive teachings of JKD. The concepts of "Stop hits & stop kicks," and "Simultaneous parrying & punching," based on the concept of single fluid motions that attack while defending (in systems such as épée fencing and Wing Chun), compose JKD's defensive teachings. These were modified for unarmed combat and implemented into the JKD framework by Lee to complement the principle of interception.

Stance
Seen in many of his film fight scenes such as in the Way of the Dragon where he fought against Chuck Norris, Bruce Lee fought in a side southpaw horse stance. His jabs and crosses came from his right hand and followed up with a lot of sidekicks. Instead of a common check seen in muay thai, Bruce uses an oblique leg kick to block a potential kick. This technique is called the jeet tek ("stop kick" or "intercepting kick"). He adopted other defensive concepts found in many other systems such as slipping and rolling from Western boxing and forearm blocks found in Eastern martial arts such as Kung Fu.

Footwork
Lee's nimble and agile skipping-like footwork is seen in his movies. This technique was adopted from Muhammad Ali's footwork in his boxing stance. This footwork can be achieved from practice using a jump rope as jumping rope imitates this nimble, jumpy action that is a quick way to maneuver your way around and away from an enemy's strikes. The footwork also has its influences from fencing.

Straight lead
Lee felt that the straight lead was the most integral part of Jeet Kune Do punching, saying, "The leading straight punch is the backbone of all punching in Jeet Kune Do." The straight lead is not a power strike but a strike formulated for speed. It is believed that the straight lead should always be held loosely with a slight motion, as this adds to its speed and makes it more difficult to see and block. The strike is believed to be not only the fastest punch in JKD, but also the most accurate. The speed is attributed to the fact that the fist is held out slightly making it closer to the target and its accuracy is gained from the punch being thrown straight forward from one's centerline. The lead should be held and thrown loosely and easily, tightening only upon impact, adding to one's punch. The punch can be thrown from multiple angles and levels.

Non-telegraphed punch
Lee believed that explosive attacks, without telegraphing signs of intent, were most effective. He argued that the attacks should catch the opponent off-guard, throwing them off balance and leaving them unable to defend against subsequent attacks. "The concept behind this is that when you initiate your punch without any forewarning, such as tensing your shoulders or moving your foot or body, the opponent will not have enough time to react," Lee wrote. The key is that one must keep one's body and arms loose, weaving one's arms slightly and only becoming tense upon impact. Lee wanted no wind-up movements or "get ready poses" to prelude any JKD attacks. He explained that any twitches or slight movements before striking should be avoided as they will give the opponent signs or hints as to what is being planned and then they will be able to strike first while one is preparing an attack. Consequently, the non-telegraphed movement is believed to be an essential part of Jeet Kune Do philosophy.

"Be like water"
Lee emphasized that every situation, in fighting or in everyday life, is varied. To obtain victory, therefore, it is believed essential not to be rigid, but to be fluid and adaptable to any situation. Lee compared it to being like water, saying "Empty your mind, be formless, shapeless, like water. If you put water into a cup, it becomes the cup. You put water into a bottle and it becomes the bottle. You put it in a teapot it becomes the teapot. Now water can flow, or it can crash. Be water, my friend." His theory behind this was that one must be able to function in any scenario one is thrown into and should react accordingly. One should know when to speed up or slow down, when to expand and when to contract, and when to remain flowing and when to crash. It is the awareness that both life and fighting can be shapeless and ever-changing that allows one to be able to adapt to those changes instantaneously and bring forth the appropriate solution. Lee did not believe in styles and felt that every person and situation is different and not everyone fits into a mold; one must remain flexible in order to obtain new knowledge and victory in both life and combat. It is believed that one must never become stagnant in the mind or method, always evolving and moving towards improving oneself.

Economy of motion 
Jeet Kune Do seeks to be economical in time and movement, teaching that the simplest things work best, as in Wing Chun. The economy of motion is the principle by which JKD practitioners achieve:

 Efficiency: An attack that reaches its target in the least time, with maximum force
 Directness: Doing what comes naturally in a disciplined way
 Simplicity: Thinking in an uncomplicated manner; without ornamentation

This is meant to help a practitioner conserve both energy and time, two crucial components in a physical confrontation. Maximized force seeks to end the battle quickly due to the amount of damage inflicted upon the opponent. Rapidity aims to reach the target before the opponent can react, which is half-beat faster timing, as taught in Wing Chun and Western boxing. Learned techniques are utilized in JKD to apply these principles to a variety of situations.

Stop hits
"When the distance is wide, the attacking opponent requires some sort of preparation. Therefore, attack him on his preparation of attack. To reach me, you must move to me. Your attack offers me an opportunity to intercept you." This means intercepting an opponent's attack with an attack of one's own instead of simply blocking it. It is for this concept Jeet Kune Do is named. JKD practitioners believe that this is the most difficult defensive skill to develop. This strategy is a feature of some traditional Chinese martial arts as Wing Chun, as well as an essential component of European épée Fencing. Stop hits and kicks utilize the principle of economy of motion by combining attack and defense into one movement, thus minimizing the "time" element.

Simultaneous parrying and punching
When confronting an incoming attack, the attack is parried or deflected, and a counterattack is delivered simultaneously. This is not as advanced as a stop hit but more effective than blocking and counterattacking in sequence. Practiced in some Chinese martial arts such as Wing Chun, it is also known in Krav Maga as "bursting". Simultaneous parrying and punching utilize the principle of economy of motion by combining attack and defense into one movement, thus minimizing the "time" element and maximizing the "energy" element. Efficiency is gained by utilizing a parry rather than a block. By definition, a "block" stops an attack, whereas a parry merely re-directs it. Redirection has two advantages, it requires less energy to execute and utilizes an opponent's energy against him by creating an imbalance. Efficiency is gained in that an opponent has less time to react to an incoming attack, since he is still withdrawing from his attack.

Low kicks
JKD practitioners believe they should direct their kicks, as in Wing Chun, to their opponent's shins, knees, thighs, and midsection. These targets are the closest to the feet, provide more stability and are more difficult to defend against. Maintaining low kicks utilizes the principle of economy of motion by reducing the distance a kick must travel, thus minimizing the "time" element. However, as with all other JKD principles nothing is set in stone. In a typical JKD style, if a target of opportunity presents itself, even a target above the waist, one could take advantage and not be hampered by this principle.

Four ranges of combat
 Kicking
 Punching
 Trapping
 Grappling

Jeet Kune Do students train in each of the aforementioned ranges equally. According to Lee, this range of training serves to differentiate JKD from other martial arts. He stated that most but not all traditional martial arts systems specialize in training at one or two ranges. His theories have been especially influential and substantiated in the field of mixed martial arts, as the MMA Phases of Combat are essentially the same concept as the JKD combat ranges.

As a historic note, the ranges in JKD have evolved over time. Initially the ranges were categorized as short or close, medium, and long range. These terms proved ambiguous and some instructors eventually evolved into their more descriptive forms, although there is a lot of disagreement on whether or not this is correct. Many believe that the 3 ranges as described above are correct as distance to a target doesn't dictate what 'tools' can be used. For example, in close range, one can still kick, in addition to punching, grappling, trapping etc. To rename 'close range' the trapping or even grappling range is conditioning the practitioner in believing that is all that should be done in that particular range. So for this reason many still prefer these original three categories.

Five ways of attack
JKD's original five ways of attack are:

 Simple Angular Attack or Simple Direct Attack (SAA or SDA)
 Hand Immobilizing Attacks (HIA)
 Progressive Indirect Attack (PIA)
 Attack By Combination (ABC)
 Attack By Drawing (ABD)

Centerline
    The centerline is an imaginary line drawn vertically along the center of a standing human body, and refers to the space directly in front of that body. If one draws an isosceles triangle on the floor, for which one's body forms the base, and one's arms form the equal legs of the triangle, then h (the height of the triangle) is the centerline. The Wing Chun concept is to exploit, control and dominate an opponent's centerline. All attacks, defenses, and footwork are designed to guard one's own centerline while entering the opponent's centerline space. Lee incorporated this theory into JKD from his Sifu Ip Man's Wing Chun.

The three guidelines for the centerline are:

 The one who controls the centerline will control the fight.
 Protect and maintain your own centerline while you control and exploit your opponent's.
 Control the centerline by occupying it.

This notion is closely related to maintaining control of the center squares in the strategic game chess. The concept is naturally present in xiangqi (Chinese chess), where an "X" is drawn on the game board, in front of both players' general and advisors.

Combat realism
One of the premises that Lee incorporated in Jeet Kune Do was "combat realism." He insisted that martial arts techniques should be incorporated based upon their effectiveness in real combat situations. This would differentiate it from other systems where there was an emphasis on "flowery technique", as Lee would put it. He claimed that flashy "flowery techniques" would arguably "look good" but were often not practical or would prove ineffective in street survival and self-defense situations. This premise would differentiate JKD from other "sport"-oriented martial arts systems that were geared towards "tournament" or "point systems" (traditional martial art). Lee felt that these systems were "artificial" and fooled their practitioners into a false sense of true martial skill. He felt that because these systems incorporated too many rule sets that would ultimately handicap a practitioner in self-defense situations and that these approaches to martial arts became a "game of tag" leading to bad habits such as pulling punches and other attacks; this would again lead to negative consequences in real-world situations.

Another aspect of realistic martial arts training fundamental to JKD is what Lee referred to as "Aliveness". This is the concept of training techniques with an unwilling assistant who offers resistance. He made a reference to this concept in his famous quote "Boards don't hit back!" Because of this perspective of realism and aliveness, Lee utilized safety gear from various other contact sports to allow him to spar with opponents "full out". This approach to training allowed practitioners to come as close as possible to real combat situations with a high degree of safety.

Conditioning
To keep up with the demand of Jeet Kune Do combat, the practitioners must condition their bodies. Some exercises Lee did included Da Sam Sing or Gak Sam Sing which is a traditional method of forearm conditioning practiced in Classical Kung Fu. He also did exercises simulating a fight against a four-limbed human using the traditional Mook Yan Jong (Cantonese) used in Wing Chun.

Bruce Lee was an avid follower of Pakistani wrestler Great Gama's training routine. He read articles about him and how he employed his exercises to build his legendary strength for wrestling, quickly incorporating them into his own routine. The training routines Lee used included isometrics as well as "the cat stretch", "the squat" (known as "baithak"), and also known as the "deep-knee bend."

Influence and references in popular culture
Kato from Green Hornet is the first fictional character to use Jeet Kune Do, as he was portrayed by Bruce Lee in the 1966 TV series. In the afore-mentioned TV series, Lee would demonstrate various techniques associated with Jeet Kune Do. Following Lee's impact and death, Kato would utilize JKD in subsequent incarnations of Green Hornet media.

Fighting games
Various video game characters utilize Jeet Kune Do as their choice way of fighting. These include:
 Liu Kang, Johnny Cage and Mokap uses JKD as a fighting style in Mortal Kombat.	
 Jacky Bryant and Sarah Bryant from Virtua Fighter.
 Marshall Law, Forest Law, and Lee Chaolan from Tekken.
 Midknight from Eternal Champions.
 Jann Lee from Dead or Alive
 Fei Long from Super Street Fighter II.

Notable practitioners

 Bruce Lee (founder)
 Steve McQueen 
 Chuck Norris 
 Jon Jones
 Taky Kimura 
 James Coburn 
 Brandon Lee
 Dan Inosanto
 Erik Paulson
 Ernest Emerson
 Glenn Danzig 
 James Wilks
 Jang Hyuk
 Jason David Frank
 Jeff Imada
 Jerry Poteet
 Joe Lewis
 Junichi Okada
 Kareem Abdul-Jabbar
 Nicolas Cage 
 Patrick Marcil
 Richard Bustillo
 Ron Balicki
 Tim Tackett
 Yorinaga Nakamura
 Jason Scott Lee
 Bob Bremer
 Herb Jackson
 Native Lorenzo

See also
Tao of Jeet Kune Do
Bruce Lee's Fighting Method
 Chinese Gung Fu: The Philosophical Art of Self-Defense
Bruce Lee filmography
Bruce Lee Library 
List of awards and honors received by Bruce Lee
Bruceploitation 
Bruce Lee (comics)

Notes

References

Bibliography

External links 

 Bruce Lee's Fighting Method Complete Edition on Internet Archive
 Tao of Jeet Kune Do on Internet Archive

 
Bruce Lee
Hybrid martial arts
North American martial arts
Wing Chun
1967 introductions